Mohamed Abulasad El-Alem (محمد أبو الأسعاد العالم, Mohammad Abu al-Asad al-Alim) was the mufti of Tripolitania from 1945 to 1951 and elected President of the Libyan National Assembly in 1951.  He was a signatory to the original Libyan Constitution of 1951.

Notes

Libyan diplomats
Libyan politicians
Libyan imams